"Can't Let Go" is a song by American singer-songwriter Mariah Carey from her second studio album, Emotions (1991). It was released as the album's second single on October 23, 1991, by Columbia Records in the United States and the first quarter of 1992 elsewhere. It was written and produced by Carey and Walter Afanasieff. The protagonist of this synthesizer-heavy ballad laments an ex-lover who has moved on, and though she tries she "can't let go."

Carey had fallen out with her songwriting partner Ben Margulies following a financial dispute, and her record label suggested that she work with the other producers of her debut album such as Rhett Lawrence, Ric Wake and Narada Michael Walden. She chose Afanasieff, who had produced her second single "Love Takes Time" (1990), and "Can't Let Go" was one of the songs they created. After the release of the single "Emotions," "Can't Let Go" was promoted on both The Arsenio Hall Show in September 1991 and Saturday Night Live in November 1991 when she was the musical guest in the episode which featured Linda Hamilton as the host. "Can't Let Go" was later included on Carey's compilation album The Ballads (2008).

Music and lyrics
"Can't Let Go" has a moderate tempo of 80 beats per minute. Carey's vocal range spans three octaves and seven semitones from the low note of F3 to the high note of C7.

Critical reception

AllMusic editor Ashley S. Battel wrote that "yearning cries for a lost love in "Can't Let Go" serves to send the listener on a musical journey through time filled with varying emotions. Larry Flick from Billboard described it as a "rhythmic R&B/pop ballad", adding, "Her now-trademark vocal acrobatics are showcased amid gospel-spiced harmonizing and dramatically executed instrumentation." Clark and DeVaney from Cashbox commented, "This time Carey is slowing down the pace from the first single "Emotions". In our opinion, this should have been the first single taken off the album. Her voice still has that crystal-clear sound that has hypnotized listeners of all sorts." Los Angeles Times editor Dennis Hunt felt that in this song, Mariah is playing a wounded lover. Rob Tannenbaum of Rolling Stone wrote that "moody grandeur" of this song will sound great on radio. On the song, Sian Pattenden from Smash Hits described Carey as "the Nanette Newman of pop".

Chart performance

Carey's first five American singles had reached number one on the Billboard Hot 100. "Can't Let Go" ended the streak when it reached number two and spent 17 weeks in the top 40. The song topped the Hot Adult Contemporary Tracks, where it became Carey's fourth number one single.

"Can't Let Go" reached number three in Canada and the top 20 in the UK.

Music video
The single's accompanying music video, directed by Jim Sonzero, features Carey wearing an evening gown and her hair in a bun. Filmed in black and white, the video starts and closes with shots of a rose open and closed respectively.

Usage in other media
A radio edit of the song was promoted to radio and used for the video instead of the original song, and the edit eliminates the seraphic pre-intro and removes all of Carey's high notes at the song's beginning and end. Like Carey's previous U.S. singles, "Can't Let Go" won a BMI Pop Award in 1993. In 2015, rapper Rick Ross released a remix version of the song on his eighth studio album Black Market, titled "Can't Say No", in which Carey re-recorded her part with various new lyrics.

Copyright issues
In 1992, writers Sharon Taber and Ron Gonzalez filed a copyright infringement lawsuit against Carey and Afanasieff citing that "Can't Let Go" was taken from their unknown song, "Right Before My Eyes." The plaintiffs demanded to obtain copies of the studio recording tapes to see if conversation between Carey and Afanasieff would prove them guilty. However, after being reviewed, the only guilty fear apparent was Mariah Carey quoted as saying "Can't Let Go" was sounding "too much like our other song." The lawsuit was later dropped or settled out of court.

Track listings

 Worldwide CD and cassette single
 "Can't Let Go" (edit)
 "To Be Around You"

 European CD maxi-single 1
 "Can't Let Go" (edit)
 "To Be Around You"
 "The Wind"

 European CD maxi-single 2
 "Can't Let Go" (edit)
 "I Don't Wanna Cry"
 "All in Your Mind"

Credits and personnel
Recording
 Recorded at Skywalker Sound, Marin Country; The Plant Recording Studios, Sausalito; Right Track Recording, NYC.
 Mixed at Right Track Recording, NYC.

Personnel
 Lyrics – Mariah Carey
 Music – Mariah Carey, Walter Afanasieff
 Production – Mariah Carey, Walter Afanasieff
 Keyboards, Synthesizers, Synthesizer Bass, Synclavier Acoustic Guitar, Drums and Percussion Arrangement and Programming – Walter Afanasieff
 Guitars – Michael Landau
 Synclavier/Akai Programming – Ren Klyce
 Synclavier/Macintosh Programming – Gary Cirmelli
 Arrangement – Mariah Carey, Walter Afanasieff
 Recording Engineer – Dana Jon Chappelle
 Assistant engineers; Bruce Calder, Craig Silvey
 Mixing – Dana Jon Chappelle
 Vocal arrangement – Mariah Carey, Walter Afanasieff
 Background vocals – Mariah Carey

Credits adapted from the liner notes of Emotions.

Charts

Certifications

See also
 List of number-one adult contemporary singles of 1992 (U.S.)

References

1991 singles
Mariah Carey songs
Contemporary R&B ballads
1990s ballads
Songs written by Walter Afanasieff
Songs written by Mariah Carey
Song recordings produced by Walter Afanasieff
1991 songs
Columbia Records singles
Black-and-white music videos
Sony Music singles
Songs about heartache
Soul ballads
Torch songs
Songs involved in plagiarism controversies